Tales of the Baroness, a three-part animated short film. Musician Sarah Slean teamed up with video director Nelson Chan of Mary, Day One in this series. It is about a young girl named Georgina hoping to cure a cursed nunnery with her scientific skills, while encountering the legendary Baroness.

The first segment aired May 11, 2007 on Bravo!FACT Presents.

External links 
 Sarah Slean Website 
 FlyingMonkeyCreations 
Bravofact!

2007 television films
2007 animated films
2007 films
Canadian television films
Canadian animated short films
2000s English-language films
2000s Canadian films